The 1952–53 NBA season was the Pistons' fifth season in the NBA and 12th season as a franchise.

The Pistons finished the season above .500 at 36-33 (.522), 3rd in the Western Division.  The team advanced to the playoffs, defeating the Rochester Royals 2-1 in the opening series, including a 67-65 home nail-biter to take the series, but lost in the division finals 3-2 to the Minneapolis Lakers as each team won at home in the 5-game series.   The Pistons were led on the season by center-forward Larry Foust (14.3 ppg, 11.5 rpg, NBA All-Star), guard Andy Phillip (10.0 ppg, 5.0 apg, NBA All-Star) and Don Meineke (10.7 ppg, 6.9 rpg), who would win the inaugural NBA Rookie of the Year Award.  First round draft choice Dick Groat (11.9 ppg) would play for the Pistons while finishing his degree at Duke University, left the team in February 1953 to serve in the United States Army and returned to sports in 1955 to pursue a baseball career.  Groat became one of 13 players to play in both the NBA and Major League Baseball.

Draft picks

Regular season

Season standings

x – clinched playoff spot

Record vs. opponents

Game log

Playoffs

|- align="center" bgcolor="#ccffcc"
| 1
| March 20
| @ Rochester
| W 84–77
| Fred Schaus (20)
| Edgerton Park Arena
| 1–0
|- align="center" bgcolor="#ffcccc"
| 2
| March 22
| Rochester
| L 71–83
| Larry Foust (24)
| War Memorial Coliseum
| 1–1
|- align="center" bgcolor="#ccffcc"
| 3
| March 24
| @ Rochester
| W 67–65
| Larry Foust (18)
| Edgerton Park Arena
| 2–1
|-

|- align="center" bgcolor="#ffcccc"
| 1
| March 26
| @ Minneapolis
| L 73–83
| Larry Foust (16)
| Minneapolis Auditorium
| 0–1
|- align="center" bgcolor="#ffcccc"
| 2
| March 28
| @ Minneapolis
| L 75–82
| Larry Foust (21)
| Minneapolis Auditorium
| 0–2
|- align="center" bgcolor="#ccffcc"
| 3
| March 30
| Minneapolis
| W 98–95
| Fred Scolari (27)
| War Memorial Coliseum
| 1–2
|- align="center" bgcolor="#ccffcc"
| 4
| April 1
| Minneapolis
| W 85–82
| Larry Foust (20)
| War Memorial Coliseum
| 2–2
|- align="center" bgcolor="#ffcccc"
| 5
| April 2
| @ Minneapolis
| L 58–74
| Larry Foust (16)
| Minneapolis Auditorium
| 2–3
|-

Awards and records
Don Meineke, NBA Rookie of the Year Award

References

See also
1952-53 NBA season

Detroit Pistons seasons
Fort